MMPV may refer to:

 Medium Mine Protected Vehicle
 Marine Multi-purpose Vehicle